Castries District is one of 10 districts (formerly called quarters) of the Caribbean island nation of Saint Lucia. According to the 2012 census, the population of the district was 80,573, having shown a slow but steady increase over the past ten years. The capital of Saint Lucia, the city of Castries, is located in this district. During the Saint Lucia Jazz Festival, the city of Castries plays host to several stages.

Geography

There are 123 second-order administrative divisions in the Castries District.

The town of Castries is a port city. Shoppers flock to the city's dozens of stores and to Castries Market for fruits, vegetables and handicrafts. Sightseers admire murals painted by a local artist inside Cathedral of the Immaculate Conception, and relax in Derek Walcott Square, named for the St. Lucian Nobel Prize–winning poet. Atop Morne Fortune (Hill of Good Luck) – where the French and English battled over control of the island – visitors take in panoramic vistas.

Castries is home to some of the most popular resorts on island, including The BodyHoliday LeSport, Rendezvous Couples Resort, Windjammer Landing, Sandals Resorts, and more.

Government
The seat of the Castries District government is the town of Castries.

The Castries District is divided into the following electoral constituencies represented in the House of Assembly of Saint Lucia:
Babonneau, population 12,844, Hon. Dr. Virginia Albert-Poyotte
Castries East, population 11782, Hon. Philip J. Pierre
Castries South, population 9463, Hon. Dr. Ernest Hilaire 
Castries Central, population 7274, Hon. Richard Frederick
Castries South East, population 14516, Hon. Joachim Andre Henry
Castries North, population 11463, Hon. Stephenson King

See also
Districts of Saint Lucia
Geography of Saint Lucia
List of cities in Saint Lucia
List of rivers of Saint Lucia
Politics of Saint Lucia

References

Castries
Quarters of Saint Lucia
Subdivisions of Saint Lucia